Atonio Leawere or Antonio Leawere is a Fijian politician. He was a member of the Senate of Fiji and represented Serua.

References

Members of the Senate (Fiji)
Living people
Year of birth missing (living people)